Enrique Baliño Pavón (born 20 June 1928 in Montevideo; died 14 October 2018) was a Uruguayan basketball player who competed in the 1952 Summer Olympics. Balino was a member of the Uruguayan team, which won the bronze medal. He played in all eight matches. Baliño died on October 14, 2018 at the age of 90.

References

External links

1928 births
2018 deaths
Basketball players at the 1952 Summer Olympics
Olympic basketball players of Uruguay
Olympic bronze medalists for Uruguay
Uruguayan men's basketball players
Uruguayan people of Spanish descent
Olympic medalists in basketball
Medalists at the 1952 Summer Olympics
Sportspeople from Montevideo